Simei MRT station is an above-ground Mass Rapid Transit (MRT) station on the East–West line in Tampines planning area, Singapore, at the centre of Simei housing estate flanked by Simei Street 1 and Simei Street 3 next to Eastpoint Mall. This station primarily serves Simei, a residential estate part of the larger Tampines New Town.

Simei station and the estate it serves is a Pinyin romanization of four beauties in Chinese, which in turn was named after four ancient Chinese women.

History
Prior to the building of the station, it was originally known as Tampines South. The name of Simei was changed from Tampines South in 1985, prior to the station's opening in 1989. The station was renamed to reflect the station's location as it was now situated within the estate now known as Simei.

As with most above-ground stations built during the initial construction of the East–West line, the station lacked platform screen doors. Following successful trials at Jurong East, Yishun and Pasir Ris stations, half height platform screen doors were installed and went into operation on 3 July 2011. High-volume low-speed fans were also installed on the platform's ceiling in 2011.

References

External links
 

Railway stations in Singapore opened in 1989
Tampines
Simei
Mass Rapid Transit (Singapore) stations